Dmytro Olehovych Shevchenko (born 15 April 2000) is a Ukrainian professional footballer who plays as a central midfielder.

References

External links
 
 
 

2000 births
Living people
Piddubny Olympic College alumni
Footballers from Kyiv
Ukrainian footballers
Association football midfielders
FC Arsenal Kyiv players
FC Lyubomyr Stavyshche players
FC VPK-Ahro Shevchenkivka players
Ukrainian First League players
Ukrainian Amateur Football Championship players